Col du Noyer (el. 1664 m.) is a high mountain pass in the Alps in the department of Hautes-Alpes in France.

Appearances in Tour de France
The pass was first included in the Tour de France in 1970 and has since featured 4 times, most recently in 2010.

See also
 Cycling Col du Noyer - Maps, Profiles, Photos
 List of highest paved roads in Europe
 List of mountain passes

References

Mountain passes of Provence-Alpes-Côte d'Azur
Mountain passes of the Alps